The Z-80 SoftCard is a plug-in Apple II processor card developed by Microsoft to turn the computer into a CP/M system based upon the Zilog Z80 central processing unit (CPU). Becoming the most popular CP/M platform and Microsoft's top revenue source for 1980, it was eventually renamed the Microsoft SoftCard, and was succeeded by Microsoft's Premium Softcard IIe for the Apple IIe.

Overview
Introduced in 1980 as Microsoft's first hardware product, and bundled with the Microsoft BASIC programming language, the Z-80 SoftCard is an Apple II processor card that enables the Apple II to run CP/M, an operating system from Digital Research. This gives Apple II users access to many more business applications, including compilers and interpreters for several high-level languages. CP/M, one of the earliest cross-platform operating systems, is easily adaptable to a wide range of auxiliary chips and peripheral hardware, but it requires an Intel 8080-compatible CPU, which the Zilog Z80 is, but which the Apple's CPU, the MOS Technology 6502, is not. The SoftCard has a Zilog Z80 CPU plus some 74LS00 series TTL chips to adapt that processor's bus to the Apple bus. As CP/M requires contiguous memory from address zero, which the Apple II doesn't have; addresses are translated in order to move non-RAM areas to the top of memory.

History
The SoftCard was Paul Allen's idea. Its original purpose was to simplify porting Microsoft's computer-language products to the Apple II. The SoftCard was developed by Tim Paterson of Seattle Computer Products (SCP). SCP built prototypes, Don Burtis of Burtronix redesigned the card, and California Computer Systems manufactured it for Microsoft. Unsure whether the card would sell, Microsoft first demonstrated it publicly at the West Coast Computer Faire in March 1980.

Microsoft also released a version for the Apple IIe, the Premium Softcard IIe. The card has functionality equivalent to the Extended 80-Column Text Card, including its 64 kB RAM, so would save money for users who wanted CP/M capability, additional memory, and 80-column text.

Reception

Sales
The SoftCard's immediate success surprised Microsoft. Although unprepared to take orders at the West Coast Computer Faire, a Microsoft executive accepted 1,000 business cards from interested parties on the first day; Compute! reported that the company was "inundated" with orders. The SoftCard became the company's largest revenue source in 1980, selling 5,000 units in three months at $349 each, with high sales continued for several years. The SoftCard was the single most-popular platform to run CP/M, and Z-80 cards became very popular Apple II peripherals. By 1981 Microsoft, Lifeboat Associates, and Peachtree Software published their CP/M software on Apple-format disks.

Critical reception
Compute! witnessed the SoftCard's debut in March 1980 at the West Coast Computer Faire, calling it "an Apple breakthru". InfoWorld in 1981 called the SoftCard "a fascinating piece of hardware". While criticizing the "computerese" of the CP/M documentation, the magazine wrote "if you need a lightweight, portable Z80 computer, the Apple/SoftCard combination is a perfect pair." BYTE wrote, "Because of the flexibility that it offers Apple users, I consider the Softcard an excellent buy .. The price is reasonable, and it works".

InfoWorld in 1984 also favorably reviewed the SoftCard IIe, approving of its ability to also replace the Extended 80-Column Text Card. The magazine concluded that it "is a good system among several good systems on the market", especially for those who wanted to run Microsoft BASIC or wanted functionality beyond CP/M.

Alternatives
Others independent designs came from Applied Engineering, PCPI (with their 6 MHz Appli-Card), Cirtech, IBS. There were also about a dozen SoftCard clone manufacturers.

References

External links
 AppleLogic website, showing peripheral cards for the Apple II series of computers, including the Microsoft Softcard

Apple II family
Compatibility cards
Computer-related introductions in 1980
Microsoft hardware